"T.N.T. for the Brain" is a song by German musical project Enigma, released as the second and last from their third album, Le Roi est mort, vive le Roi! (1996). It peaked at number 60 in the UK.

Overview
The Introduction samples "Horsell Common and the Heat Ray" from Jeff Wayne's Musical Version of The War of the Worlds.

Critical reception
British magazine Music Week rated the song three out of five, adding, "More of the same for Enigma with this second offering from their latest gold album."

Single track listing
 2-track CD single
 "Radio Edit" – 4:00
 "Instrumental Mix" – 4:07

 3-track CD single
 "Radio Edit" – 4:00
 "Instrumental Mix" – 4:07
 "Midnight Man Remix" – 5:56

 4-track CD single
 "Radio Edit" – 4:00
 "Midnight Man Remix" – 5:56
 "Album Version" – 4:34
 "Instrumental Mix" – 4:07

Charts

References

Enigma (German band) songs
1997 songs
Songs written by Michael Cretu
1997 singles
Virgin Records singles
Song recordings produced by Michael Cretu